Maynard Ferguson Plays Jazz for Dancing is an album released by Canadian jazz trumpeter Maynard Ferguson featuring tracks recorded in early 1959 and originally released on the Roulette label.

Reception

Allmusic awarded the album 3 stars and states "Ferguson and his excellent orchestra purposely play it safe, performing pleasing but unadventurous music that is not as exciting as their more jazz-oriented sessions of the era".

Track listing
 "Hey There" (Jerry Ross, Richard Adler) – 2:58
 "Where's Teddy" (Maynard Ferguson, Willie Maiden) – 2:37
 "If I Should Lose You" (Ralph Rainger, Leo Robin) – 3:35
 "I'll Be Seeing You" (Sammy Fain, Irving Kahal) – 2:25
 "'Tis Autumn" (Henry Nemo) – 3:07
 "Secret Love" (Fain, Paul Francis Webster) – 2:22
 "I'm Beginning to See the Light" (Duke Ellington, Don George, Harry James, Johnny Hodges) – 2:38
 "It Might as Well Be Spring" (Richard Rodgers, Oscar Hammerstein II) – 3:28
 "Stompin' at the Savoy" (Edgar Sampson, Chick Webb, Benny Goodman, Andy Razaf) – 2:23
 "'Round Midnight" (Thelonious Monk, Cootie Williams) – 3:10
 "Soft Winds" (Goodman) – 3:31

Personnel 
Maynard Ferguson – trumpet, valve trombone, euphonium
Bill Chase, Don Ellis, Larry Moser – trumpet
Don Sebesky – trombone, bass trombone
Slide Hampton – trombone
Jimmy Ford – alto saxophone
Carmen Leggio, Willie Maiden – tenor saxophone
John Lanni – baritone saxophone
Bob Dogan – piano 
Jimmy Rowser – bass  
Frankie Dunlop – drums
Slide Hampton, Willie Maiden, Don Sebesky – arrangers

References 

1959 albums
Maynard Ferguson albums
Roulette Records albums
Albums produced by Teddy Reig